James Ellwood "Irish" McCloskey (May 26, 1910 – August 18, 1971) was a Major League Baseball pitcher. He played one season with the Boston Bees in 1936.

McCloskey attended high school at Lancaster High School in Lancaster, New York. In 2013, he was inducted into the high school's athletic hall of fame.

References

External links

Boston Bees players
1910 births
1971 deaths
Baseball players from Pennsylvania
People from Danville, Pennsylvania
Major League Baseball pitchers
Jersey City Skeeters players
St. Bonaventure Bonnies baseball players
Syracuse Chiefs players
Wilkes-Barre Barons (baseball) players
Baltimore Orioles (IL) players
Lockport White Sox players
Trenton Spartans players